Franz Schachner (born 20 July 1950) is an Austrian former competitive luger who competed during the mid-1970s.    Teamed with Rudolf Schmid together they won the bronze medal in the men's doubles event at the 1976 Winter Olympics of Innsbruck.

Schachner also won two bronze medals in the men's doubles event at the FIL World Luge Championships (1974, 1975). He also won a silver at the 1970 FIL European Luge Championships in Hammarstrand, Sweden.

References

External links

 

1950 births
Living people
Austrian male lugers
Olympic lugers of Austria
Olympic bronze medalists for Austria
Lugers at the 1972 Winter Olympics
Lugers at the 1976 Winter Olympics
Olympic medalists in luge
Medalists at the 1976 Winter Olympics